Apagomerella versicolor is a species of beetle in the family Cerambycidae. It was described by Boheman in 1859. It is known from Argentina, Uruguay, Paraguay and Brazil.

References

Hemilophini
Beetles described in 1859